Nucleolar protein 56 is a protein that in humans is encoded by the NOP56 gene.

Nop56p is a yeast nucleolar protein that is part of a complex with the nucleolar proteins Nop58p and fibrillarin. Nop56p is required for assembly of the 60S ribosomal subunit and is involved in pre-rRNA processing. The protein encoded by this gene is similar in sequence to Nop56p and is also found in the nucleolus. Multiple transcript variants encoding several different isoforms have been found for this gene, but the full-length nature of most of them have not been determined.

References

Further reading